Charolais or Charollais may refer to:

 Charolais, France, a region and historic county of Burgundy, France
 Charolais cattle, a breed of cattle
 Charolais horse, an extinct horse breed
 Charollais sheep, a breed of sheep
 , a French goat cheese